Georgios Christodoulou (born 20 May 1967) is a Greek former professional footballer who played as forward.

Club career
Christodoulou started his football career at Akratitos. On 11 July 1985, as a young footballer unknown to the general football public, Christodoulou was transferred to AEK Athens. He took part in the team's preparation in Sweeden and the manager, Jacek Gmoch trusted him with 6 appearances in his first season. At the end of the season, Christodoulou returned on loan to Akratitos and returned to AEK in the summer of 1987. Todor Veselinović used him in just 2 league matches and in the second half of the season he was loaned to Acharnaikos. In his second return to AEK in the summer of 1988 and the team's new coach Dušan Bajević seemed to have a lot of faith in him and worked with him a lot, as he was a very talented, skilled and quick striker with good finishing. He gave him plenty of chances during the season and the young striker took advantage of them by helping the team either as a starter or as a substitute, in winning the championship after 10 years. In fact, his goal at Toumba Stadium against PAOK was one of the most decisive of the season. The following year he also had a very good presence and despite the transfer of Daniel Batista to the club, Bajević distributed playing time to all the strikers he used. On 30 August 1989, he equalized the score in the Super Cup against Panathinaikos, where the match was sent to penalties,  which led in AEK winning the title. In the home match against Marselle for the European Cup, Christodoulou won the penalty with which Toni Savevski scored. In the 8–0 triumph at home over Xanthi, he scored a hat-trick including an unforgettable goal with an amazing heel. Afterwards the problems began. He was gradually losing his place in the team, while rumors said that he had serious problems with his off-field life. Eventually, Christodoulou left the team in 1991, having won 1 Championship, 1 Super Cup and 1 League Cup.

He signed for Proodeftiki and later continued playing in Cyprus, but ultimately never returned to a high level.

After football
After the end of his career, Christodoulou stayed away from football. He occupied a portion of the media over some issues he had with justice, but he returned to his normal living with his family in Ano Liosia.

Honours

AEK Athens 
Alpha Ethniki: 1988–89
Greek Super Cup: 1989
Greek League Cup: 1990

References

1967 births
Living people
Super League Greece players
A.P.O. Akratitos Ano Liosia players
AEK Athens F.C. players
Acharnaikos F.C. players
Proodeftiki F.C. players
Pezoporikos Larnaca players
Association football forwards
Footballers from Athens
Greek footballers
Greek expatriate footballers
Expatriate footballers in Cyprus
Greek expatriate sportspeople in Cyprus